Law & Order: Legacies is an episodic graphic adventure video game based on the Law & Order franchise. It was developed by Telltale Games and was originally announced as Law & Order: Los Angeles, but it was changed to include fan favorite characters from the entire run of the Law & Order franchise. Among them are Rey Curtis, Lennie Briscoe, Anita Van Buren, Abbie Carmichael, Jack McCoy, Mike Logan, Michael Cutter, and Adam Schiff from Law & Order, and Olivia Benson from Law & Order: Special Victims Unit.

It was released in seven episodes, with the first two episodes released simultaneously on iOS on December 22, 2011. The remaining five episodes, as well as versions for Windows and Mac OS X, were released in the spring of 2012. Like the previous three Law & Order games, this is a graphic adventure game that mirrors the TV series in having both police procedural and courtroom portions to the game play. The game was withdrawn from sale on digital platforms after Telltale Games chose not to renew their digital distribution agreement with license holders.

Episodes
Law & Order: Legacies is composed of seven episodes, released over the course of four months.

Reception

Law & Order: Legacies received mixed to negative reviews from critics upon release. On Metacritic, the game holds a score of 53/100 for the PC version based on 10 reviews, indicating "mixed or average reviews".

References

2011 video games
Crime investigation simulators
Episodic video games
IOS games
MacOS games
Point-and-click adventure games
Telltale Games games
Video games about police officers
Video games based on Law & Order (franchise)
Video games based on television series
Video games developed in the United States
Video games set in New York City
Windows games